Buzz number is a term applied to the large letter and number combination applied to United States Air Force military aircraft in the years immediately after World War II, through the early 1960s. This moniker evolved from aircrew speculation that the large numbers were meant to dissuade "buzzing" (very-low-altitude high-speed passes over populated areas) by increasing the likelihood of being identified and punished. 

The first two letters of a buzz number indicated the type and designation of an aircraft while the last three were generally the last three digits of the aircraft serial number. Air Force fighters used buzz numbers starting with the letter F (or P, when fighters were designated as "pursuit" aircraft before June 1948), while bombers started with the letter B. For example, a P-51 Mustang would have a buzz number such as FF-230 while an F-86 Sabre might be FU-910. A B-66 Destroyer would have a buzz number such as BB-222. One of the last Air Force fighters to carry a buzz number was the F-4 Phantom II (FJ), then called the F-110 Spectre by the Air Force.

List of buzz codes

This table lists U.S. Air Force and U.S. Army aircraft by buzz-number prefix. Note that some aircraft types changed prefixes during their career, while other prefixes were re-used after an earlier type was retired.

See also
Tail code
United States military aircraft serials

References
Citations

Bibliography

Further reading

External links
Aerofiles Buzz Numbers & Tail Codes

Military aviation
United States Air Force lists
Aircraft markings